Gholam Nabi (also Romanized as Gholām Nabī) is a village in Nazil Rural District, Nukabad District, Khash County, Sistan and Baluchestan Province, Iran. At the 2006 census, its population was 81, in 13 families.

References 

Populated places in Khash County